The White Earth River is a tributary of the Missouri River, approximately 50 mi (80 km) long, in northwestern North Dakota in the United States. It rises in the plains of southeastern Divide County, approximately 10 mi (16 km) east of Wildrose. It flows east and south, through Mountrail County and joins the Missouri in Lake Sakakawea.

See also
List of North Dakota rivers

References

External links

Rivers of North Dakota
Bodies of water of Divide County, North Dakota
Bodies of water of Mountrail County, North Dakota
Bodies of water of Williams County, North Dakota
Tributaries of the Missouri River